Graymoor-Devondale is a home rule-class city in Jefferson County, Kentucky, United States. The city is the result of the merger of the former cities of Graymoor and Devondale. The population was 2,870 at the 2010 census.

Geography
Graymoor-Devondale is located in northeastern Jefferson County at  (38.273370, -85.617259). It is bordered to the southeast by Lyndon, to the south by St. Matthews, to the west by Windy Hills, to the northwest by Crossgate, to the north by Bancroft, and to the northwest, north, and northeast by consolidated Louisville/Jefferson County. The western border of the community is formed by Interstate 264, with access from Exit 21 (Westport Road) to the south and Exit 22 (U.S. Route 42) to the north.

History

Devondale was incorporated sometime in 1958 and apparently named for a local farm.

Graymoor was also named for a local farm, itself named for the monastery of the Society of the Atonement in Garrison, New York. Merged with the nearby subdivision of Woodstock, it was formally incorporated by the state assembly on November 17, 1959.

Graymoor and Devondale merged on November 6, 1985, and were reïncorporated together on November 23, 1987. This allowed them (in 1992) to reach 4th-class status and control the zoning of properties around the Westport Rd.–Herr Ln. intersection.

Demographics

As of the 2000 U.S. census, there were 2,925 people, 1,134 households, and 742 families residing in the city. The racial makeup of the city was 90.39% White, 5.20% Black or African American, 0.31% Native American, 2.43% Asian, 0.17% Pacific Islander, 0.58% from other races, and 0.92% from two or more races. Hispanic or Latino of any race were 1.71% of the population.

There were 1,134 households, out of which 27.6% had children under the age of 18 living with them, 53.3% were married couples living together, 9.7% had a female householder with no husband present, and 34.5% were non-families. 31.2% of all households were made up of individuals, and 14.0% had someone living alone who was 65 years of age or older. The average household size was 2.28 and the average family size was 2.86.

In the city, the population was spread out, with 19.8% under the age of 18, 5.3% from 18 to 24, 23.0% from 25 to 44, 21.6% from 45 to 64, and 30.4% who were 65 years of age or older. The median age was 46 years. For every 100 females, there were 75.0 males. For every 100 females age 18 and over, there were 67.2 males.

The median income for a household in the city was $51,065, and the median income for a family was $66,613. Males had a median income of $46,283 versus $30,431 for females. The per capita income for the city was $29,755. About 2.4% of families and 3.0% of the population were below the poverty line, including 2.4% of those under age 18 and 0.6% of those age 65 or over.

References

External links
City of Graymoor-Devondale official website

Cities in Kentucky
Cities in Jefferson County, Kentucky
Louisville metropolitan area
Populated places established in 1985
1985 establishments in Kentucky